A bonfire of the vanities is a burning of objects condemned by religious authorities as occasions of sin. The phrase itself usually refers to the bonfire of 7 February 1497, when supporters of the Dominican friar Girolamo Savonarola collected and burned thousands of objects such as cosmetics, art, and books in the public square of Florence, Italy, on the occasion of Shrove Tuesday, martedí grasso.

Francesco Guicciardini's The History of Florence gives a firsthand account of the 1497 Florentine bonfire of the vanities. The focus of this destruction was on objects that might tempt one to sin, including vanity items such as mirrors, cosmetics, fine dresses, playing cards, and musical instruments. Other targets included books which Savonarola deemed immoral (such as works by Boccaccio), manuscripts of secular songs, and artworks, including paintings and sculpture.

Precursors 
Although often associated with Savonarola, such bonfires had been a common accompaniment to the outdoor sermons of San Bernardino di Siena in the first half of the 15th century.

Savonarola 
Fra Girolamo Savonarola was a Dominican friar who was assigned to work in Florence in 1490, at the request of Lorenzo de' Medici – although within a few years Savonarola became one of the foremost enemies of the House of Medici and helped bring about their downfall in 1494. Savonarola campaigned against what he considered to be the artistic and social excesses of Renaissance Italy, preaching with great vigor against any sort of luxury. His power and influence grew so much that with time, he became the effective ruler of Florence, and had soldiers for his protection following him around.

Starting in February 1495, during the time in which the festival known as Carnival occurred, Savonarola began to host a regular "bonfire of the vanities". He collected various objects that he considered to be objectionable: irreplaceable manuscripts, ancient sculptures, antique and modern paintings, priceless tapestries, and many other valuable works of art, as well as mirrors, musical instruments, and books on divination, astrology, and magic.

Anyone who tried to object found their hands being forced by teams of Savonarola supporters. These supporters called themselves Piagnoni (“Weepers”) after a public nickname that was originally intended as an insult.

Savonarola's influence did not go unnoticed by the higher church officials, however, and his actions came to the attention of Pope Alexander VI. He was excommunicated on 13 May 1497. The charges were heresy and sedition at the command of Pope Alexander VI. Savonarola was executed on 23 May 1498, hanged on a cross and burned to death. His death occurred in the Piazza della Signoria, where he had previously held his bonfires of the vanities. Then the papal authorities gave word that anyone in possession of the friar's writings had four days to turn them over to a papal agent for destruction. Anyone who did not comply also faced excommunication.

Botticelli 
Although some later sources reported that the Florentine artist Sandro Botticelli burned several of his paintings based on classical mythology in the great Florentine bonfire of 1497, the main source on his life, Vasari's biography, does not mention this, nor does any early record. Vasari does assert that Botticelli produced nothing after coming under the influence of Savonarola, but this is not accepted by modern art historians, and several of his paintings are assigned dates after Savonarola's death in 1498. The art historian Rab Hatfield says that one of Botticelli's paintings, The Mystical Nativity, cryptically dated 1500, is based on the sermon Savonarola delivered on Christmas Eve, 1493.

Writing several centuries later in 1851, Orestes Brownson, an apologist for Savonarola, vaguely mentions artworks by Fra Bartolomeo, Lorenzo di Credi, and "many other painters", along with "several antique statues" being burnt in the bonfire.

In popular culture
The event has been represented or mentioned in varying degrees of detail in a number of works of historical fiction, including George Eliot's Romola (1863),  E. R. Eddison's A Fish Dinner in Memison (1941), Irving Stone's The Agony and the Ecstasy (1961), Chelsea Quinn Yarbro's The Palace (1978), Michael Ondaatje's The English Patient (1992), Roger Zelazny and Robert Sheckley's If at Faust You Don't Succeed (1993), Timothy Findley's Pilgrim (1999), Ian Caldwell and Dustin Thomason's Rule of Four (2004), Jeanne Kalogridis's I, Mona Lisa (2006), Traci L. Slatton's The Botticelli Affair (2013), and Jodi Taylor's  No Time Like the Past (2015), and in television dramas including the Showtime series The Borgias, The Sky (Italy) and the Netflix (North America) series Borgia, and the third season (2019) of the Netflix (North America) series Medici in the final episode titled "The Fate of the City." Other references in popular culture include:

 As a metaphor, Tom Wolfe used the event and ritual as the title for his 1987 novel The Bonfire of the Vanities and its film adaptation.
 Vampires Marius and Armand visit the scene of Savonarola's execution after his body has been cleared away in Anne Rice's The Vampire Armand (1998)
 The Bonfire is also depicted in the video game Assassin's Creed II, in which Savonarola is one of the antagonists.
 Jordan Tannahill's 2016 play Botticelli in the Fire is a fictional retelling of the events leading up to the bonfire of the vanities.

See also
Book burning
The Birth of Venus (novel)
Bonfire Night
Outward holiness

References

Further reading

External links
 Echoes of Botticelli in Early Modern Sources Explores primary sources related to Botticelli and Savonarola

15th-century Christianity
Censorship in Christianity
Italian Renaissance
Book burnings
1497 in Europe
15th century in the Republic of Florence
Iconoclasm
Girolamo Savonarola